Lewis Merryn Ochoa (born 24 June 1991) is an English semi-professional footballer who plays as a midfielder. He began his career in the Football League with Brentford, for whom he made one professional appearance, before dropping into non-League football upon his release in 2009.

Career

Brentford 
Ochoa began his career in the youth system at Brentford in 2002 and by 2008 had progressed into the youth team. He received his maiden call into the first team squad for a League Cup first round match versus Swansea City on 12 August 2008 and remained an unused substitute during the 2–0 defeat. Ochoa made his professional debut in a Football League Trophy first round shootout win over Yeovil Town on 2 September 2008, when he came on as a substitute in the 83rd minute for Frankie Artus. He was called into the squad three further times during the 2008–09 season, but would not appear for the club again. Ochoa was released in June 2009.

Non-League football 
Ochoa dropped into non-League football when he signed for Conference South club Maidenhead United in August 2009. Despite making just 19 appearances during the 2009–10 season and being forced to find additional game time away with Hendon on a dual-registration deal, he was a part of the Magpies' Berks & Bucks Senior Cup-winning team. Ochoa moved into the Southern League for the 2010–11 and 2011–12 seasons and played for Bedfont Town, Burnham and A.F.C. Hayes.

In 2012, Ochoa dropped down to the Spartan South Midlands League Premier Division to join Hanwell Town and made a minor contribution to the club's promotion to the Southern League at the end of the 2013–14 season. Ochoa had a full season of Southern League First Division Central football with Chalfont St Peter in 2015–16 and moved across to the Isthmian League Premier Division to join Harrow Borough in June 2016. He was a part of the Boro team which reached the first round proper of the 2015–16 FA Cup. After a brief spell back with Hanwell Town, Ochoa joined Southern League First Division Central club Northwood in October 2017. By February 2018, he had departed the club.

Personal life 
As of February 2018, Ochoa was living in Australia.

Career statistics

Honours 
Maidenhead United
 Berks & Bucks Senior Cup: 2009–10

References

External links

Lewis Ochoa at Soccerbase

1991 births
Living people
English footballers
Brentford F.C. players
Maidenhead United F.C. players
Hendon F.C. players
Bedfont Town F.C. players
Burnham F.C. players
A.F.C. Hayes players
Hanwell Town F.C. players
Chalfont St Peter A.F.C. players
Harrow Borough F.C. players
National League (English football) players
Isthmian League players
Southern Football League players
Northwood F.C. players
Black British sportspeople
Association football midfielders